Estherville is a city in Emmet County, Iowa, United States. The population was 5,904 in the 2020 census, a decline from 6,656 at the 2000 census. It is the county seat of Emmet County.

History
Emmet County was initially created by an act of the Iowa Legislature in 1851. The area that is now Estherville witnessed the arrival of its first settlers around 1856 and into 1857. In 1859 the city was selected as the county seat and was eventually incorporated in 1881. 

Estherville was named after Esther A. Ridley, one of the first white female settlers in the area. Many of Estherville's current residents are the descendants of the original Scandinavian, German and Irish immigrants that arrived in the community in the 1870's.

Features and attractions
The Regional Wellness Center was a joint project of Estherville Lincoln Central Community School District and the National Guard. Beyond standard gym equipment, the facility boasts an indoor track, pools with slides, and multiple group fitness classes.

Estherville is home to a beautifully restored Carnegie Library. Library services include free public wireless internet.

The intersection of Iowa Highways 4 and 9 features a statue of the Estherville meteorite breaking up in flight.

Fort Defiance State Park offers a variety of hiking and horseback trails, a campsite and outdoor meeting areas. The park was named after a military fort constructed in Estherville in 1863 in response to the Dakota War of 1862. 

After the 1862 conflict began, the Iowa Legislature authorized “not less than 500 mounted men from the frontier counties at the earliest possible moment, and to be stationed where most needed”, this number was soon reduced. No fighting took place in Iowa, the Dakota uprising led to the rapid expulsion of the few unassimilated Native Americans left there. Today Fort Defiance State Park covers 191 acres and is governed by the Iowa Department of Natural Resources. The park is home to numerous Whitetail Deer.

Geography
Estherville's longitude and latitude coordinates in decimal form are 43.404375, -94.833592.

Estherville is near Okoboji and Spirit Lake.

Climate

According to the Köppen Climate Classification system, Estherville has a hot-summer humid continental climate, abbreviated "Dfa" on climate maps.

Demographics

2010 census
As of the census of 2010, there were 6,360 people, 2,607 households, and 1,546 families residing in the city. The racial makeup of the city was 90.6% White, 0.8% African American, 0.7% Native American, 0.6% Asian, 5.4% from other races, and 1.9% from two or more races. Hispanic or Latino of any race were 11.0% of the population.

There were 2,607 households, of which 28.8% had children under the age of 18 living with them, 44.1% were married couples living together, 10.1% had a female householder with no husband present, 5.1% had a male householder with no wife present, and 40.7% were non-families. 35.2% of all households were made up of individuals, and 15.4% had someone living alone who was 65 years of age or older. The average household size was 2.29 and the average family size was 2.95.

The median age in the city was 37.2 years. 23.2% of residents were under the age of 18; 12.7% were between the ages of 18 and 24; 22.3% were from 25 to 44; 23.9% were from 45 to 64; and 18% were 65 years of age or older. The gender makeup of the city was 50.3% male and 49.7% female.

The median income for a household in the city was $31,279, and the median income for a family was $41,042. Males had a median income of $27,500 versus $20,441 for females. The per capita income for the city was $16,488. About 5.0% of families and 8.1% of the population were below the poverty line, including 9.4% of those under age 18 and 9.3% of those age 65 or over.

Education
Estherville–Lincoln Central Community School District operates area public schools. It was established on July 1, 1997, by the merger of the Estherville and Lincoln Central school districts.  The district opened the 2016–17 school year with the elementary, middle, and high schools on a single campus. This is the final stage of a plan which has seen the construction of new elementary and middle school buildings as well as renovation of the high school. 

Estherville is home to the main campus of Iowa Lakes Community College.

Sports
Estherville was home to minor league baseball in 1912. The Estherville team won the Championship in the 1912 Iowa State League, an Independent level league. The team was managed by Harry Welch.

Local media
The area is served by the Estherville Daily News, both in print and on-line.
Two local radio stations serve the region, KILR (AM) and KILR-FM.
The closest television station is CBS News affiliate KEYC-TV, in Mankato, Minnesota.

Meteorite

On May 10, 1879, a 455-pound meteorite fell to earth in Emmet County a few miles north of Estherville, and has become known as the Estherville Meteorite. When it struck it buried itself 15 feet in the ground. It is made of mesosiderite. Portions of the meteorite are on display in the Estherville Public Library, the Smithsonian Museum of Natural History, the Museum Reich der Kristalle in Munich, Germany and the Natural History Museum, Vienna, Austria.

Notable people  

William M. McFarland (1848–1905), McFarland started the Brooklyn Chronicle newspaper in Brooklyn, Iowa, and then the Estherville Vindicator newspaper in Estherville. While living in Estherville, McFarland served in the Iowa House of Representatives from 1888 to 1892 and was a Republican. He then served as Iowa Secretary of State from 1891 to 1897. 
Christopher Morphew (born 1967) grew up in Estherville. He is a noted American academic and the current dean of the Johns Hopkins School of Education. He has held leadership positions in the Association for the Study of Higher Education and the American Educational Research Association.
Benjamin Adam "BJ" Sifrit (born 1977), gained notoriety in 2002 for the murders of Joshua Ford and Martha Crutchley.  
Sherie Scheer (born 1940), photographer Born in Estherville, Iowa.
Frank P. Woods (1868–1944), five-term US Representative from 1909 to 1919
 Robert Hansen (1939–2014), Serial Killer. Between 1971 and 1983, Hansen abducted, raped, and murdered at least 17 women in and around Anchorage, Alaska. He was arrested and convicted in 1983 and sentenced to 461 years in prison.

References

External links
 

City of Estherville Official  City website
Estherville Area Chamber of Commerce
Estherville Daily News
City Data Comprehensive Statistical Data and more about Estherville

Cities in Iowa
Cities in Emmet County, Iowa
County seats in Iowa
Populated places established in 1881
1881 establishments in Iowa